Nothobranchius angelae is a species of brightly colored seasonal killifish in the family Nothobranchiidae. This species is endemic to seasonal freshwater habitats in north-central Tanzania in Eastern Africa.

Sources

Links
 Nothobranchius angelae on WildNothos - various information and photographs of this species

angelae
Fish described in 2019
Fish of Tanzania
Endemic fauna of Tanzania